Russell Audley Ferdinand "Russ" Henderson  (7 January 1924 – 18 August 2015) was a jazz musician on the piano and the steelpan. Originally from Trinidad and Tobago, he settled in England in the 1950s. He is most widely recognised as one of the founding figures of the Notting Hill Carnival in London, United Kingdom.

Biography
Russell Henderson was born in Belmont, Port-of-Spain, where he grew up. He founded the Russell Henderson Quartet in the 1940s and was soon well known in Trinidad, accompanying calypsonians such as Lord Pretender, Mighty Growler and Roaring Lion. He was also pianist for Beryl McBurnie's dance troupe at the Little Carib Theatre in Woodbrook, and taught melodies to the steelpan pioneer Ellie Mannette of Invaders Steelband.

In 1951, Henderson travelled to England to study piano tuning at the North London Polytechnic.

He settled in England and founded Britain's first steelband combo (The Russ Henderson Steel Band) with Mervyn Constantine and Sterling Betancourt in late 1952. They played their first gig at The Sunset Club at 50 Carnaby Street. Other compatriots Henderson worked with in the early London days were calypsonians Lord Kitchener and Young Tiger.

From 1962 Henderson began playing on Sunday lunchtimes at the Coleherne pub on Old Brompton Road, Earls Court, where he wa joined by other West Indian jazz musicians including Joe Harriott and Shake Keane. Henderson was vitally involved in building up Notting Hill Carnival, having played at the first Children's Carnival there in 1964. In 1966, a street party for neighbourhood children turned into a carnival procession when Henderson decided to liven things up by leading his steel band down the street, followed by a growing crowd.

He was a friend of the 606 Club in London, where he performed a monthly show with his revised jazz quartet, sharing the evening with the Al Whynette Band. In his retirement Henderson gave numerous interviews with BBC Radio 4 and BBC Four on his Notting Hill past.

Russell Henderson died on 18 August 2015 at the age of 91.

Honours
In 2006, Henderson was appointed a member of The Most Excellent Order of the British Empire for Services to Music.

On Friday, 24 August 2012, just prior to the Notting Hill Carnival weekend, the Nubian Jak Community Trust organised the unveiling of two blue plaques in Notting Hill at the junction of Tavistock Road known as "Carnival Square", to honour the contributions to the development of Carnival by two "living giants": Russell Henderson, the Trinidadian musician who led the first carnival parade in 1965, and Leslie Palmer, also from Trinidad and Tobago, who is credited with helping transform the local community festival into an internationally recognised event.

Film

 The Pan Man: Russell Henderson – 22-minute documentary, directed by Michael McKenzie (2009)London

Bibliography
Contributor to Lloyd Bradley, Sounds Like London: 100 Years of Black Music in the Capital, 2013.

Oral history
 British Library, Oral History of Jazz. Interviewed by Val Wilmer, 14 October 1993.

References

External links
 Hall of Fame, Notting Hill Carnival.

Steelpan musicians
Trinidad and Tobago musicians
2015 deaths
Members of the Order of the British Empire
1924 births
British jazz pianists
Trinidad and Tobago emigrants to the United Kingdom
People from Port of Spain
Black British musicians